Alyson Sullivan (born February 7, 1988) is a Republican member of the Massachusetts House of Representatives. A resident of Abington, Massachusetts, she was elected as a Republican to represent the 7th Plymouth district. Sullivan was elected after Representative Geoff Diehl decided to run against Elizabeth Warren in the 2018 U.S. Senate Election. Sullivan is also the daughter of former State Representative and ATF Director Michael Sullivan.

Electoral history

See also
 2019–2020 Massachusetts legislature
 2021–2022 Massachusetts legislature

References 

Democratic Party members of the Massachusetts House of Representatives
Women state legislators in Massachusetts
21st-century American women politicians
21st-century American politicians
People from Abington, Massachusetts
New England Law Boston alumni
Suffolk University alumni
Living people
1988 births